XHVU-FM 97.1 is a radio station in Mazatlán, Sinaloa, Mexico. It is affiliated to MegaRadio and carries its Magia Digital grupera format.

History
XEVU-AM 720 received its first concession in February 1977. It broadcast with 1,000 watts during the day and 500 at night. XEVU became a combo in 1994.

In May 2016, XHVU flipped from Radiorama to MegaRadio affiliation and consequently changed names from Éxtasis Digital to Magia Digital, as the former is a Radiorama-specific brand.

On June 1, 2017, Radio XEVU, S.A. de C.V., presented the Federal Telecommunications Institute with the formal surrender of its AM operations.

References

Radio stations in Sinaloa
Radio stations established in 1977